The 1988 Associate Members' Cup Final, known as the Sherpa Van Trophy Final for sponsorship reasons, was the 5th final of the domestic football cup competition for teams from the Third and Fourth Divisions.

The final was played at Wembley Stadium in London on 29 May 1988, The game was contested by Burnley and Wolverhampton Wanderers before a crowd of 80,841, a then record for the trophy, which was not bettered until the 2019 final between Sunderland and Portsmouth. 
Wolves won the match 2–0 thanks to goals in either half by Andy Mutch and Robbie Dennison.

Background
The match took place three weeks after the end of the domestic league programme. Wolves had already won the Fourth Division title in their second ever season at that level, and boasted the division's top goalscorer in Steve Bull (34 league goals; 52 in total). Burnley had finished tenth in the division and would take four further seasons before being promoted. Wolves had won both league games between the two clubs that season 3–0.

It was the first time in the cup's history that two previous English champions met in the final, and Wolves were the first of the former champions to have won the trophy.

In a further twist of irony, Burnley and Wolves had contested the English league title between the two of them only twenty-eight years previously, Burnley emerging as champions on the final day of the 1959–60 season by a point (denying Wolves, FA Cup winners that season, the first English League and Cup 'double' of the 20th Century.)

Match details

Road to Wembley

Burnley

Wolverhampton Wanderers

External links
Official website

EFL Trophy Finals
Associate Members' Cup Final 1988
Associate Members' Cup Final 1988
Associate Members' Cup Final